Harmozica is a genus of air-breathing land snails, terrestrial pulmonate gastropod mollusks in the family Hygromiidae, the hairy snails and their allies.

Species 
Species with the genus include:

subgenus Batumica Schileyko, 1978
 Harmozica maiae (Hudec & Lezhawa, 1969)

subgenus Diplobursa Schileyko, 1968
 Harmozica assadovi (Likharev & Rammelmeyer, 1952)
 Harmozica pisiformis (L. Pfeiffer, 1846)

subgenus Harmozica Lindholm, 1927
 Harmozica ravergiensis (A. Férussac, 1835) - type species of the genus Harmozica

subgenus Stenomphalia Lindholm, 1927
 Harmozica selecta (Klika, 1894)

References

Hygromiidae
Gastropod genera
Taxa named by Wassili Adolfovitch Lindholm